Baldwin Township, population 7,605, is one of thirteen townships in Chatham County, North Carolina. Baldwin Township does not contain any municipalities within it.

Geography
The Haw River forms the western boundary of Baldwin Township and its tributaries drain most of the township.  These tributaries include Pokeberry Creek, Wilkinson Creek, Terrells Creek, and Collins Creek.  The northeastern part of the township is drained by Price Creek and its tributary, East Price Creek.

References

Townships in Chatham County, North Carolina
Townships in North Carolina